San Giovanni a Piro (Cilentan: San Giuanni) is a town and comune in the province of Salerno in the Campania region of southern Italy.

Geography
The town is located on a hill on the road linking Marina di Camerota to Policastro Bussentino. The municipality counts part of the coastal area of Porto Infreschi, in which is located the Sanctuary of Pietrasanta. It borders with the municipalities of Camerota, Roccagloriosa, Santa Marina and Torre Orsaia.

San Giovanni a Piro counts two hamlets (frazioni), Bosco and Scario.

See also
Scario
Cilentan Coast

References

External links

 San Giovanni a Piro official website

Cities and towns in Campania
Localities of Cilento